The Zabalaza Anarchist Communist Front (ZACF, also known as ZabFront or simply as Zabalaza), formerly known as the Zabalaza Anarchist Communist Federation (ZabFed), is a platformist–especifista anarchist political organisation in South Africa, based primarily in Johannesburg. The word zabalaza means "struggle" or "active rebellion" in isiZulu, isiXhosa and isiNdebele. Initially, as ZabFed, it was a federation of pre-existing collectives, mainly in Soweto and Johannesburg. It is now a unitary organisation based on individual applications for membership, describing itself as a "federation of individuals". Historically the majority of members have been people of colour. Initially the ZACF had sections in both South Africa and Swaziland. The two sections were split in 2007, but the Swazi group faltered in 2008. Currently the ZACF also recruits in Zimbabwe. Members have historically faced repression in both Swaziland and South Africa.

The ZACF is rooted in the Organisational Platform of the General Union of Anarchists (Draft) by the Dielo Truda group, but it does not accept the document uncritically. The ZACF is also inspired by the pamphlet Towards a Fresh Revolution, written by the Friends of Durruti, a grouping of Confederación Nacional del Trabajo (CNT, or National Confederation of Labour) members, during the Spanish Revolution, as well as by Georges Fontenis' post-war pamphlet Manifesto of Libertarian Communism. More recently it has come under the influence of South American especifismo, a tendency which originated in the Federación Anarquista Uruguaya (FAU, or Uruguayan Anarchist Federation).

ZACF members are expected to be committed, convinced anarchist communist militants who must be in general agreement with the platformist principles of theoretical and tactical unity, collective responsibility, and federalism. Its activities include study and theoretical development, anarchist agitation and participation in class struggle activism.

As a platformist–especifista organisation, the ZACF subscribes to the idea of an "active minority". This means that the ZACF, unlike certain anarcho-syndicalist organisations, does not seek to build purely anarchist mass movements or unions; nor does it seek to turn existing social movements into anarchist-only movements. Rather, in the tradition of social insertion championed by the Federação Anarquista do Rio de Janeiro (FARJ, or Anarchist Federation of Rio de Janeiro), the ZACF works within existing movements to fight for the "leadership of anarchist ideas". This entails the implementation of anarchist principles within such movements, along with a revolutionary anarchist programme. This is because the ZACF holds that the strength of trade unions, social movements and other organisations of the working class lies in their ability to unite the greatest number of workers regardless of their political, religious or ideological affiliations. At the same time, the ZACF believes such movements can only undertake a revolutionary transformation of society when they are won to revolutionary anarchist positions.

History

The ZACF is the most recent in a rather short line of South African anarchist organisations stretching back to the early 1990s, from which it has inherited some members. Following the merger of the International Socialist League (ISL) and Industrial Socialist League into the Communist Party of South Africa (CPSA) in 1921, and the destruction of the semi-syndicalist Industrial and Commercial Workers' Union of Africa (ICU) in the 1930s, anarchism (including its syndicalist variant) only began to re-emerge as a movement in South Africa with small anarchist collectives, established primarily in Durban and Johannesburg, in the 1990s. In 1993, the Anarchist Revolutionary Movement (ARM) was established in Johannesburg; its student section included militants from the anti-apartheid movement.

In 1995, a larger movement, the Workers' Solidarity Federation (WSF), replaced the ARM. The WSF incorporated a Durban-based collective which published the journal Freedom. It also produced its own journal entitled Workers' Solidarity. The WSF was in the tradition of platformism, as opposed to the far looser ARM, and focused mainly on work within black working class and student struggles. It established links with anarchist individuals and small anarchist collectives in Zimbabwe, Tanzania and Zambia. It also helped to establish a short-lived Zambian WSF.

The WSF dissolved in 1999. It was succeeded by two anarchist collectives: the Bikisha Media Collective and Zabalaza Books. These two groups co-produced Zabalaza: A Journal of Southern African Revolutionary Anarchism, which has since become the journal of the ZACF. In the late 1990s and early 2000s, activists in these structures were involved in struggles against privatisation and evictions, and Bikisha was formally affiliated to the Anti-Privatisation Forum (APF), with a Bikisha member serving as APF Media Officer.

On May Day in 2003, the ZACF was formed; initially as the Zabalaza Anarchist Communist Federation. The early ZACF was essentially a regroupment of local anarchist groups, bringing together a number of new anarchist collectives in Gauteng and Durban (including a local chapter of the Anarchist Black Cross), along with the Bikisha Media Collective and Zabalaza Books.

In 2007, to strengthen its structures, the ZACF was reconstituted as the Zabalaza Anarchist Communist Front based on direct individual affiliation in a unitary structure, rather than the looser federal system in place. By this time, the ZACF also had members in Swaziland, and was running a small social centre in Motsoaledi squatter camp in Soweto. Effectively, in its first phase, the ZACF was built through the affiliation of groups, and members came into ZabFed through the groups, each with somewhat different structures, aims and recruitment systems. With the December 2007 restructuring, members joined the ZACF directly, and then the groups. The 2007 restructuring also saw the ZACF became South African only, with a separate Swazi anarchist group set up in 2008 that remained closely allied to, but distinct from, the ZACF. ZACF policy throughout has stressed the need for a non-racial formation, with members of all races, and opposed separate organisations on the lines of race or gender.

While committed to promoting syndicalism in the unions, ZACF work was in practice largely focused on the so-called "new social movements", formed in South Africa in response to the perceived failures of the African National Congress (ANC) government post-apartheid. The ZACF was involved in the campaigns of the Anti-Privatisation Forum (APF) and the Landless People's Movement (LPM). It has also been involved in solidarity work with Abahlali baseMjondolo and the Western Cape Anti-Eviction Campaign. In addition to such work, the ZACF is active in organising workshops and propaganda.

Following the formation of the Democratic Left Front (DLF) in 2011, the ZACF became a member organisation. However, it was critical of the mostly middle-class composition of the DLF's leadership, and of the electoral ambitions of some DLF affiliates. Like a substantial section of DLF supporters, the ZACF questioned the DLF's organising processes up to, and during, the protests at "COP-17" in Durban, that is, the 2011 United Nations Climate Change Conference, which it argued were top-down and manipulated. By 2012, the ZACF had effectively left the DLF.

Links to other organisations
The ZACF, as ZabFed, was part of the short-lived International Libertarian Solidarity (ILS), as were its predecessors Bikisha Media Collective and Zabalaza Books.

Following the disbanding of the ILS, the ZACF became part of the platformist–especifista Anarkismo network. As such, the ZACF has close links to the member organisations of the Anarkismo network; particularly with the Workers' Solidarity Movement (WSM) in Ireland, Common Struggle – Libertarian Communist Federation (formerly NEFAC) in the United States, the Federazione dei Comunisti Anarchici (FdCA, or Federation of Anarchist Communists) in Italy, the FAU in Uruguay, Alternative libertaire (AL, or Libertarian Alternative) in France, the Federación Anarco-Comunista de Argentina (FACA, or Anarcho-Communist Federation of Argentina), the FARJ in Rio de Janeiro, the Organização Anarquista Socialismo Libertário (OASL, or Libertarian Socialism Anarchist Organisation) in São Paulo and the Federação Anarquista Gaúcha (FAG, or Gaúcha Anarchist Federation) in Rio Grande do Sul. (The latter three are members of the Coordenação Anarquista Brasileira, or Brazilian Anarchist Coordination.) It has also had intermittent contact with the Awareness League in Nigeria and with numerous smaller anarchist collectives in Africa. It retains contact with syndicalist unions linked to the erstwhile ILS, such as the Confederación General del Trabajo (CGT, or General Confederation of Labour) in Spain.

Publications
The ZACF publishes Zabalaza: A Journal of Southern African Revolutionary Anarchism. This journal is the organisation's theoretical journal and contains ideological and analytical articles aimed to benefit the anarchist communist movement in general, and the southern African anarchist communist movement in particular. Additionally, it publicises and promotes the official line of the ZACF as determined by the organisation's membership. The ZACF's other major publication is Zabalaza.net, the official website of the organisation.

Zabalaza Books

Zabalaza Books is an anarchist publishing project linked to the ZACF. It is an anarchist literature mail order project that publishes and distributes classic and contemporary anarchist books, pamphlets, music, and videos in the southern African region. It originated as an underground collective in the 1990s at the end of apartheid. The topics covered include anarchism, revolutionary unionism, women's liberation, revolutionary history, national liberation and decolonisation, and many others. It distributes much of the literature in PDF format on its website.

References

External links
Official website
Zabalaza Books
Position Positions of the ZACF, adopted 2003
Position Paper against "Separate Organisations" (by race, gender etc.) of the ZACF, adopted 2003
Zabalaza: a Journal of Southern African Revolutionary Anarchism

2003 establishments in South Africa
Anarchism in South Africa
Anarchist Federations
Anarchist organizations in Africa
Civic and political organisations of South Africa
Communism in South Africa
Civic and political organisations based in Johannesburg
Organizations established in 2003
Platformist organizations